Right to Kill? is a 1985 American made-for-television drama film directed by John Erman and written by Joyce Eliason. It is based on a true story of two teens living in Wyoming, Richard Jahnke and Deborah Jahnke, who were charged for the killing of their psychotically abusive father, Richard Jahnke, Sr.

The made-for-TV movie was filmed at W.W. Samuell High School in Dallas, Texas in 1985 and aired nationally on May 22, 1985, on ABC. The film's leading actors were Frederic Forrest (Oscar-nominated for The Rose in 1979) and Justine Bateman, who was nominated for an Emmy for playing the role of an emotionally and physically abused daughter in this movie.

The movie was a success but it was not released on video in the United States. The cast included Frederic Forrest, Christopher Collet, Karmin Murcelo, Justine Bateman, Ann Wedgeworth & J. T. Walsh.

Cast
Frederic Forrest as Richard Jahnke Sr. 
Christopher Collet as Richard Jahnke Jr.
Karmin Murcelo as Maria Jahnke
Justine Bateman as Deborah Jahnke
Ann Wedgeworth as Eva Whitcomb
Terry O'Quinn as Jim Barrett
Lisa Blake Richards as Vera Scofield
J. T. Walsh as Major Eckworth
Alison Bartlett as Candy
John M. Jackson as Social Worker
Jerry Haynes as Mr. Harris
Daniel von Bargen as Detective Roberts
Robert Ginnaven as Detective Marquez
Marc Gilpin as Billy

References

External links 
 

American drama television films
1985 television films
1985 films
1985 drama films
Films directed by John Erman
Films about domestic violence
1980s English-language films